Helena Bušová (born Helena Buschová) (21 October 1914 – 28 November 1986) was a Czechoslovak actress. She appeared in more than thirty films from 1932 to 1948.

In 1948 she emigrateded to London and in 1957 she moved with her family to Canada.

Selected filmography

References

External links 

1914 births
1986 deaths
Czechoslovak actresses
Czechoslovak emigrants to the United Kingdom
British emigrants to Canada